Rudolf Otto (31 August 1887 – 9 September 1962) was a German painter. His work was part of the painting event in the art competition at the 1936 Summer Olympics.

References

1887 births
1962 deaths
20th-century German painters
20th-century German male artists
German male painters
Olympic competitors in art competitions
People from Děčín District